Antoinette Batumubwira (born 1956, in Ngozi, Burundi) is a Burundian politician. She was Minister of Foreign Affairs of Burundi from 2005 to 2009. She is married to former foreign minister Jean-Marie Ngendahayo.

In late 2007, Batumubwira was named as a candidate to succeed Alpha Oumar Konaré as Chairperson of the Commission of the African Union in the election for that post in early 2008. The government tried to obtain the support of other African countries for her candidacy, and African Great Lakes nations pledged that they would support her; however, the government later withdrew her candidacy and backed Jean Ping of Gabon.

See also
List of the first women holders of political offices in Africa

References

1956 births
Living people
Women government ministers of Burundi
Female foreign ministers
Foreign ministers of Burundi
Women government officials
21st-century women politicians
Burundian women diplomats
People from Ngozi Province